Pōniuāʻena, also named J100758.264+211529.207 or J1007+2115, is the third most-distant quasar known, with a measured redshift of z = 7.515 or a lookback time of 13.02 billion years. Its 1.5 billion–solar mass black hole is the most distant known black hole with a mass of over one billion solar masses, and models indicate that it must have formed not later than 100 million years after the Big Bang, before reionization. Its discovery was announced in June 2020. Only the quasars ULAS J1342+0928 (z = 7.54) and J0313–1806 (z = 7.64) are known to be more distant.

The quasar was primarily observed at the Mauna Kea Observatories on the island of Hawaii; it was first discovered at the Gemini Observatory and was further identified using data from the W. M. Keck Observatory, UKIRT, Magellan Telescopes, and ALMA. Hawaiian language experts at ʻImiloa Astronomy Center gave it the name Pōniuāʻena , which "evokes the unseen spinning source of creation, surrounded by brilliance."

References

Further reading

Quasars
Supermassive black holes
Leo (constellation)